Anna Hartwell Lusk (January 8, 1870 – August 21, 1968) was an American socialite during the Gilded Age.

Early life
Anna was born in New York City on January 8, 1870.  She was the daughter of Professor William Thompson Lusk (1838–1897) and Mary Hartwell (née Chittenden) Lusk (1840–1871).  At age 31, her mother and a 13-day-old sister, Lily Adams Lusk, died in September 1871, a year and a half after Anna's birth, and Chittenden Memorial Library at Yale University was built in honor of Anna's mother. Among her surviving siblings were elder brother was Dr. Graham Lusk (a physiologist and nutritionist), who married Mary Woodbridge Tiffany (a daughter of Louis Comfort Tiffany); Mary Elizabeth Lusk, who married journalist and author Cleveland Moffett; and Dr. William Chittenden Lusk, who, like Anna, did not marry.  Her father was an Adjutant-General in the United States Volunteers during the Civil War.

Her maternal grandparents were Mary Elizabeth (née Hartwell) Chittenden and U.S. Representative Simeon B. Chittenden.  Her paternal grandparents were Sylvester Graham Lusk and Elizabeth Freeman Lusk (née Adams).

Society life
In 1892, Anna, listed as "Miss Lusk", was included in Ward McAllister's "Four Hundred", purported to be an index of New York's best families, published in The New York Times. Conveniently, 400 was the number of people that could fit into Mrs. Astor's ballroom.

In 1907, Lusk purchased land from the Paul Smith Hotel Company and hired architect Grosvenor Atterbury to design a "camp" for her, in the Queen Anne style, on Upper St. Regis Lake in New York's Adirondack mountains, adjoining the camp of her brother, known as "Camp Comfort" in Brandreth Park.  The camp, which was opened in 1908, "[was to] be one of the most elaborate and extensive of the entire chain of lakes" and featured a two-story living hall with a "monumental fieldstone fireplace."  Anna sold the camp to Dr. and Mrs. A. S. Chase of New York around 1921.

Personal life
Lusk, who did not marry, died at age 98 in Guilford, Connecticut, where she had lived for many years, on August 21, 1968.  She was buried in Woodlawn Cemetery in the Bronx.

References
Notes

Sources

External links
 

1870 births
1968 deaths
American socialites
People included in New York Society's Four Hundred